KQLX may refer to:

 KQLX (AM), a radio station (890 AM) licensed to Lisbon, North Dakota, United States
 KQLX-FM, a radio station (106.1 FM) licensed to Lisbon, North Dakota, United States